Borys Arkadiyovych Finkel (born 2 February 1968) is a Ukrainian retired professional footballer.

Career statistics

International goals

References

External links
 

1968 births
Living people
Sportspeople from Chernivtsi
Soviet footballers
Ukrainian footballers
Ukraine international footballers
Association football forwards
FC Bukovyna Chernivtsi players
CSF Bălți players
FC Halychyna Drohobych players
FC Dnipro players
FC Nyva Vinnytsia players
FC Dnipro Cherkasy players
FC Amberg players
Soviet Second League players
Ukrainian Premier League players
Ukrainian First League players
Ukrainian expatriate footballers
Expatriate footballers in Germany
Ukrainian expatriate sportspeople in Germany
Jewish footballers
Jewish Ukrainian sportspeople
Soviet Jews